Benjamin Way (1740–1808) of Denham Place was an English politician, Member of Parliament for  in 1765.

The son of Lewis Way F.R.S., director of the South Sea Company by his third wife Abigail, he matriculated at Christ Church, Oxford in 1758. He was a Fellow of the Royal Society, elected 1771, and of the Society of Antiquaries of London. He acted as High Sheriff of Buckinghamshire in 1777; was President of Guy's Hospital; and was Sub-Governor of the South Sea Company.

Family
By his wife Elizabeth Anne, daughter of William Cooke, Provost of King's College, Cambridge, he had seven sons and nine daughters. Lewis Way was the second son. Gregory Holman Bromley Way was the fifth son. His daughter Catherine married Sir Montague Cholmeley, 1st Bt. (b. 20 Mar 1772, d. 10 Mar 1831).

Notes

1740 births
1808 deaths
Members of the Parliament of Great Britain for English constituencies
British MPs 1761–1768
Fellows of the Royal Society
Fellows of the Society of Antiquaries of London